Yuliya Sergeyevna Stupak (née Belorukova; born 21 January 1995) is a Russian cross-country skier who competes internationally with the Russian national team.

She competed at the FIS Nordic World Ski Championships 2017 in Lahti, Finland, 2018 Winter Olympics in Pyeongchang, South Korea, and FIS Nordic World Ski Championships 2019 in Seefeld, Austria.

Cross-country skiing results
All results are sourced from the International Ski Federation (FIS).

Olympic Games
 4 medals – (1 gold, 3 bronze)

World Championships
 3 medals – (2 silver, 1 bronze)

World Cup

Season standings

Individual podiums
3 victories – (2 , 1 ) 
9 podiums – (6 , 3 )

Team podiums
 2 victories – (1 , 1 ) 
 3 podiums – (1 , 2 )

Personal life
Stupak is married to Nikita Stupak. Their child, Arseny, was born on 7 January 2020.

Notes

References

External links

1995 births
Living people
Russian female cross-country skiers
FIS Nordic World Ski Championships medalists in cross-country skiing
Cross-country skiers at the 2018 Winter Olympics
Cross-country skiers at the 2022 Winter Olympics
Olympic cross-country skiers of Russia
Medalists at the 2018 Winter Olympics
Medalists at the 2022 Winter Olympics
People from the Komi Republic
Olympic gold medalists for the Russian Olympic Committee athletes
Olympic bronze medalists for Olympic Athletes from Russia
Olympic bronze medalists for the Russian Olympic Committee athletes
Olympic medalists in cross-country skiing
Tour de Ski skiers
Sportspeople from the Komi Republic